Adrian Ioan Jigău (born 6 January 1970) is a Romanian male weightlifter, competing in the 62 kg category and representing Romania at international competitions. He competed at world championships, most recently at the 2006 World Weightlifting Championships.

Major results

References

External links
 
 

1970 births
Living people
Romanian male weightlifters
Place of birth missing (living people)
World Weightlifting Championships medalists
Weightlifters at the 2000 Summer Olympics
Weightlifters at the 2004 Summer Olympics
Olympic weightlifters of Romania
20th-century Romanian people
21st-century Romanian people